Milira Jones (born September 27, 1969), better known as Milira, is an American R&B/soul singer born in Hollis, New York. She released two albums in the 1990s and had four charting singles on Billboard's R&B singles chart, with two peaking top 40.

Biography
Milira Jones was born in Hollis, New York. She won amateur night at the Apollo Theater in the late 1980s, which led to a recording contract with Apollo Records, a label distributed through Motown Records. Jones was influenced by jazz musician Sarah Vaughn.

Music career
Prior to signing with Motown, Jones released her debut album on June 15, 1990, Milira. Her debut album spent 42 weeks on the Billboard R&B albums chart, reaching number 29. It scored two top 40 R&B singles, "Go Outside in the Rain" (#36) and  a cover version of Marvin Gaye's "Mercy Mercy Me (The Ecology)" featuring Noel Pointer (#21).

On June 9, 1992, Milira released her follow-up album, Back Again!!! and two songs from the album charted on Billboard's R&B singles chart, "One Man Woman" (#45) and "Three's a Crowd" (#94). Jones released her third album titled, Solution which was Christian and gospel themed with a mixture of R&B and Soul and also it was released under her own personal record label, Arilim Records and the CD album was released on September 12, 2000.

Discography

Albums

Singles

References

External links
 

1969 births
Living people
20th-century African-American women singers
American women singers
American contemporary R&B singers
21st-century African-American people
21st-century African-American women